Marino Lejarreta Arrizabalaga (born 14 May 1957) is a retired Basque professional road racing cyclist. His biggest victory was capturing the 1982 Vuelta a España, a Grand Tour stage race, and he is the inaugural and record three-time winner of the Clásica de San Sebastián (1981, 1982, 1987), which is now considered a one-day classic. In 1989, Lejarreta captured the Volta a Catalunya repeating one of his first professional wins in 1980 at the same event.

Career
Lejarreta rode very well in the 1982 Vuelta, but initially finished 2nd to Ángel Arroyo while coming in just eighteen seconds ahead of Michel Pollentier. Following the race however, Arroyo and several other riders failed doping controls in one of the biggest scandals in Vuelta history making the young Basque rider the de facto winner of the race. It was a bittersweet victory as he was not actually the victor riding into Madrid. For the 1983 Vuelta a España he would be up against Bernard Hinault, who had his teammates Laurent Fignon and Greg LeMond, as well as other strong riders including Hennie Kuiper and the Spanish riders of Pino, Alberto Fernández and a young Pedro Delgado who was riding in his second Vuelta. The leaders Jersey changed hands numerous times and Lejarreta held it early while also winning a mountain time trial, but suffered a crash and lost it. During the Lagos de Covadonga  stage he escaped from the group of favorites made up of Fernandez, Pino, Hinault, Kuiper and others and soloed to victory, but it was not enough to reclaim the lead. In the end he finished just 1:12 behind Hinault to stand on the podium in 2nd.

Later in his career he would win his only Tour de France stage in a very unusual manner. During the 1990 edition he found himself among the group of favorites as Delgado, Breukink and LeMond were battling the surprising Claudio Chiappucci for the Yellow Jersey. During stage 14 he attacked off the front of the favorites group in an effort to chase down the final few breakaway riders and go for the stage win. When he crossed the finish line ahead of the favorites he did not throw his arms up to celebrate because he did not think he caught the final breakaway rider. With the available technology not giving instant times, results and standings as it does today, it was not as easy to know what was going on from within the race and Lejarreta didn't find out until he came to a stop and was told by his team that he had won the stage.

He would win stages in all three Grand Tours and finish in the top 10 fifteen times: The Giro seven times, the Tour three times and the Vuelta five times including three podium places and a win in 1982.

Until 2015, Lejarreta was the only person in history to complete all three Grand Tours in a single year four times in a career; he did the triple in 1987, 1989, 1990 and 1991. Adam Hansen is the only rider to complete all three Grand Tours in a season more times than Lejarreta, but Hansen was never a GC Contender as Lejarreta was. In fact during the four seasons he completed all three Grand Tours he placed in the Top 10 in eight out of twelve of them.

His brother Ismael and his nephew Iñaki (killed in a road accident aged 29) were also professional cyclists.

Major results

1980
 1st  Overall Volta a Catalunya
1st  Mountains classification
 1st  Overall Escalada a Montjuïc
1st Stage 1c (ITT)
 1st Stage 4 Vuelta Asturias
 3rd Overall Tour of the Basque Country
 3rd Overall Deutschland Tour
 3rd Overall Étoile des Espoirs
 5th Overall Vuelta a España
 5th Overall Critérium du Dauphiné Libéré
1981
 1st Clásica de San Sebastián
 1st Subida al Naranco
 1st Circuito de Getxo
 1st Prueba Villafranca de Ordizia
 3rd Overall Tour of the Basque Country
 3rd Overall Volta a Catalunya
1st  Mountains classification
 4th Overall Grand Prix du Midi Libre
 8th Overall Tour du Tarn
1st Stage 3 
 8th Overall Deutschland Tour
 10th Road race, National Road Championships
 10th Tre Valli Varesine
1982
 1st  Overall Vuelta a España
1st Stage 17
 1st  Overall Vuelta a La Rioja
 1st  Overall Vuelta a Cantabria
1st Prologue 
 1st  Overall Escalada a Montjuïc
1st Stage 1a 
 1st Clásica de San Sebastián
 1st Stage 2 Vuelta a los Valles Mineros
 3rd GP Navarra
 5th Road race, UCI Road World Championships
1983
 1st  Overall Escalada a Montjuïc
1st Stages 1a & 1b (ITT)
 1st Giro dell'Appennino
 2nd Overall Vuelta a España
1st  Points classification
1st Stages 6, 8 (ITT) & 13
Held  after Stages 6–9
 2nd Giro dell'Umbria
 3rd Overall Tour of the Basque Country
 3rd Coppa Sabatini
 3rd Klasika Primavera
 5th Giro dell'Emilia
 6th Overall Giro d'Italia
 6th Subida al Naranco
 7th Giro della Provincia di Reggio Calabria
 8th Tre Valli Varesine
1984
 3rd Overall Tour of the Basque Country
 3rd Subida al Naranco
 4th Overall Giro d'Italia
1st Stage 19
1985
 2nd Gran Premio Industria e Commercio di Prato
 3rd Overall Tour of the Basque Country
 3rd Giro dell'Emilia
 3rd Coppa Sabatini
 3rd Giro dell'Appennino
 5th Overall Giro d'Italia
 6th Giro di Campania
 7th GP Industria & Artigianato di Larciano
 8th Coppa Placci
 8th Tour du Nord-Ouest
 9th Overall Tour de Romandie
1986
 1st  Overall Vuelta a Burgos
 1st Subida al Naranco
 2nd Clásica de San Sebastián
 2nd Subida a Arrate
 2nd Klasika Primavera
 5th Overall Vuelta a España
1st Stage 8 (ITT)
 6th Overall Volta a Catalunya
 7th Overall Vuelta a Murcia
1987
 1st  Overall Vuelta a Burgos
1st  Points classification
1st Prologue & Stage 4
 1st  Overall Euskal Bizikleta
 1st Clásica de San Sebastián
 1st Subida a Urkiola
 3rd Grand Prix des Nations
 3rd Klasika Primavera
 4th Overall Giro d'Italia
 7th Overall Vuelta a Murcia
 9th Overall Volta a Catalunya
 9th Coppa Sabatini
 10th Overall Tour de France
 10th Overall Tour of the Basque Country
1988
 1st  Overall Vuelta a Burgos
1st  Points classification
1st Prologue
 1st  Overall Escalada a Montjuïc
1st Stages 1a & 1b (ITT)
 1st  Overall Tour of Galicia
 1st Subida a Urkiola
 1st Prueba Villafranca de Ordizia
 3rd Overall Volta a Catalunya
 3rd Giro di Lombardia
 3rd GP Navarra
 4th Overall Tour of the Basque Country
 4th Clásica de San Sebastián
1989
 1st  Overall Volta a Catalunya
 1st Prueba Villafranca de Ordizia
 1st Stage 2 Vuelta a La Rioja
 2nd Overall Escalada a Montjuïc
 4th Milano–Torino
 5th Overall Tour de France
 8th Overall Tour of the Basque Country
 10th Overall Giro d'Italia
1990
 1st  Overall Vuelta a Burgos
1st Stages 2 & 4
 1st  Overall Escalada a Montjuïc
1st Stage 1b (ITT)
 2nd Overall Volta a Catalunya
1st  Points classification
 2nd Prueba Villafranca de Ordizia
 3rd Trofeo Comunidad Foral de Navarra
 3rd Klasika Primavera
 4th Züri-Metzgete
 5th Overall Tour de France
1st Stage 14
 7th Overall Giro d'Italia
 8th Giro di Lombardia
 10th Clásica de San Sebastián
 10th Wincanton Classic
1991
 2nd Subida a Urkiola
 3rd Overall Vuelta a España
 5th Overall Giro d'Italia
1st Stage 5
 5th Overall Tour of the Basque Country
 7th Liège–Bastogne–Liège
 8th La Flèche Wallonne

Grand Tour general classification results timeline

References

External links

 

1957 births
Living people
People from Durangaldea
Cyclists from the Basque Country (autonomous community)
Spanish male cyclists
Spanish Tour de France stage winners
Vuelta a España winners
Spanish Vuelta a España stage winners
Spanish Giro d'Italia stage winners
Sportspeople from Biscay